Adolphe Hastrel de Rivedoux was a 19th-century engraver and painter, watercolourist, lithographer and former artillery captain in the navy. Well known for his travels and his writing, he is best known as an artist who drew many watercolors, with a predilection for landscapes and the city of St. Paul, on Ile Bourbon  from September 1836 to October 1837. In 1847, ten years after his passage for Réunion, he published an album of 36 views under the title Album de l’île Bourbon with Charles Lemercier.

Biography
He was born on 4 October 1805 in Neuwiller-lès-Saverne, Bas-Rhin, as the younger son of Lieutenant-General Baron Etienne Hastrel de Rivedoux was a general of division in the French Revolutionary Wars and the Napoleonic Wars. His grandfather, Christophe Claude d'Hastrel de Rivedoux, capitain-major of infantry and chevalier de Saint-Louis, survived the Siege of Pondicherry in 1760, during the Seven Years' War.

He traveled the world for twenty years and took advantage of its military missions to draw and paint landscapes, scenes of daily life, human types and costumes. His views of various cities in France, including Les Sables d'Olonne and La Rochelle,  the colony of Senegal, Rio de Janeiro and other cities in South America are reproduced or referenced in many works of history, art history or dictionaries, French or foreign. Adolphe Hastrel was also interested in music and the beginnings of photography including daguerreotypes. Upon his return, he himself published a series of albums lithographiques. He died on 1 July 1875 in Nantes, Loire-Atlantique.

Selected works
 Arbre du Conseil près de Dacar
 Tisserand à Gorée
 Hameau de Hann dans l'anse de Gorée
 Une habitation à Gorée (Maison d'Anna Colas) Rio de Janeiro dessiné du sommet du Corcovado (1841)
 Montevideo, lithographie, vers 1845
 Pont et aqueduc de Mr Marchand, Ravine à Marquet (1847)
 Igreja de Nossa Senhoras da Glória e Santa Luzia lithography (1847)
 La Rochelle - Place de l’Hôtel de Ville, ud.
 Tour et église de Saint-Sauveur (La Rochelle) (1854)
 Le domaine impérial de la Motte-Beuvron, en Sologne (1858)

Gallery

References

AttributionThis article is based on the translation of the corresponding article on the French Wikipedia. A list of contributors can be found there at the History section.''

External links

1840-1940 - Fotohistoria. Un sitio para la historia de la fotografía argentina y latinoamericana at Fotohistoria.net
  Marchande de pains des environs de Lisbonne (around 1850) at Biblioteca nacional de Portugal

1805 births
1875 deaths
19th-century engravers
19th-century French painters
French male painters
People from Bas-Rhin
19th-century French military personnel
French engravers
19th-century French male artists